Marvin Quijano (born October 10, 1979, in San Salvador, El Salvador) is a  former Salvadoran football (soccer) player, who last played midfield for Colorado Rapids of Major League Soccer.

Beginning
Marvin Quijano began his soccer career playing for Rio Hondo college in 1998 in this season, he impressed the coaching staff with his technical brilliance and talents.
Quijano had an extremely successful season scoring 24 goals in 30 games, winning every award possible (including All American selections 1998, far west east player of the year 1998 and Rio Honda player of the year Award 1998).
Quijano was part of the Project-40 program.

L.A. Galaxy
Marvin Quijano decided to try out for the Los Angeles Galaxy roster after showing impressive skills and talent was signed up in 1999. Quijano played alongside fellow Salvadoran Mauricio Cienfuegos between 1999–2001 with 32 games and 4 goals. Quijano achieved three medals and achievements with the 2000 CONCACAF Champions Cup, 2001 US Open Cup 2001 and 2001 MLS Supporters' Shield. He was released by the Galaxy at the end of the 2001 season.

Colorado Rapids
Marvin Quijano impressed Colorado Rapids coach Tim Hankinson. They agreed to a deal for two years between 2002–2003; however,  Marvin's experience was an unhappy one, playing six games in 2002 and playing no games in 2003. He was released.

Recent activities
Marvin Quijano was appointed head coach for the Denver soccer club a semi-professional club in 2006. He was appointed as the youth coach of Colorado Rapids.

References

1979 births
Living people
Sportspeople from San Salvador
Salvadoran footballers
LA Galaxy players
MLS Pro-40 players
Colorado Rapids players
Salvadoran expatriate footballers
Expatriate soccer players in the United States
Major League Soccer players
A-League (1995–2004) players
Association football forwards
Association football midfielders